Fabiana Marcelino Claudino (born 24 January 1985) is a Brazilian volleyball player who made her debut for the Brazilian national team against Croatia. She captained Brazil to the gold medal at the 2012 Olympics.

Personal life
Claudino was born on 24 January 1985 in Belo Horizonte, Brazil.

Early life
Claudino began playing volleyball in 2000 at Minas Tênis Clube. After one year, in 2011, she won the Junior World Championship.

Career
Claudino was named Best Spiker at the 2006 World Grand Prix in Reggio Calabria, Italy, where Brazil claimed the gold medal for the sixth time at the annual competition. She represented her native country at the 2004 Summer Olympics in Athens, Greece.

Claudino was a part of the national team who won the gold medal at the 2011 Pan American Games held in Guadalajara, Mexico.

She played for Turkish professional club Fenerbahçe during the 2011–12 season.

Claudino won one of the Best Middle Blockers awards during the 2013 South American Championship. Her National Team won the Continental Championship qualifying to the 2013 World Grand Champions Cup and the 2014 World Championship.

Claudino won the bronze medal in the 2014 FIVB Club World Championship after her team defeated  the Swiss club Voléro Zürich, 3–2.

Claudino played with her national team, winning the bronze at the 2014 World Championship when her team defeated Italy, 3–2, in the bronze medal match.

Clubs
  MRV/Minas (2002–2004)
  Rio de Janeiro Vôlei Clube (2004–2010)
  Vôlei Futuro (2010–2011)
  Fenerbahçe (2011–2012)
  SESI-SP (2012–2016)
  Praia Clube (2016–2019)
  Hisamitsu Springs (2019–2020)
  Osasco/Audax (2021-)

Awards

Individuals
 2001 FIVB U17 World Championship – "Best Spiker"
 2001 FIVB U17 World Championship – "Best Blocker"
 2003 FIVB U20 world Championship – "Best Spiker"
 2005 FIVB World Grand Champions Cup – "Best Blocker"
 2006 FIVB World Grand Prix – "Best Spiker"
 2006 Pan-American Cup – "Best Blocker"
 2008 Final Four Cup – "Best Blocker"
 2009 Montreux Volley Masters – "Most Valuable Player"
 2009 FIVB World Grand Prix – "Best Blocker"
 2011 South American Championship – "Best Blocker"
 2012 Summer Olympics – "Best Blocker"
 2013 South American Championship – "Best Middle Blocker"
 2013 FIVB Grand Champions Cup – "Most Valuable Player 
 2014 South American Club Championship – "Most Valuable Player"
 2014 FIVB World Grand Prix – "Best Middle Blocker"
 2017 South American Club Championship – "Best Middle Blocker"
 2019 South American Club Championship – "Best Middle Blocker"

Clubs
 2002–03 Brazilian Superliga –  Runner-up, with MRV/Minas
 2003–04 Brazilian Superliga –  Runner-up, with MRV/Minas
 2004–05 Brazilian Superliga –  Runner-up, with Rexona/Ades
 2005–06 Brazilian Superliga –  Champion, with Rexona/Ades
 2006–07 Brazilian Superliga –  Champion, with Rexona/Ades
 2007–08 Brazilian Superliga –  Champion, with Rexona/Ades
 2008–09 Brazilian Superliga –  Champion, with Rexona/Ades
 2009–10 Brazilian Superliga –  Runner-up, with Rexona/Ades
 2010–11 Brazilian Superliga –  Champion, with Rexona/Ades
 2013–14 Brazilian Superliga –  Runner-up, with SESI-SP
 2017–18 Brazilian Superliga –  Champion, with Dentil/Praia Clube
 2018–19 Brazilian Superliga –  Runner-up, with Dentil/Praia Clube
 2006 Women's Top Volley International –  Champion, with Rexona/Ades
 2009 Women's Top Volley International –  Champion, with Rexona/Ades
 2011–12 CEV Champions League –  Champion, with Fenerbahçe Universal
 2014 South American Club Championship -  Champion, with SESI-SP
 2017 South American Club Championship –  Runner-up, with Dentil/Praia Clube
 2019 South American Club Championship –  Runner-up, with Dentil/Praia Clube
 2014 FIVB Club World Championship -  Bronze medal, with SESI-SP

References

External links
 UOL profile
 

1985 births
Living people
Brazilian women's volleyball players
Sportspeople from Belo Horizonte
Volleyball players at the 2004 Summer Olympics
Volleyball players at the 2008 Summer Olympics
Volleyball players at the 2007 Pan American Games
Volleyball players at the 2011 Pan American Games
Olympic volleyball players of Brazil
Olympic gold medalists for Brazil
Fenerbahçe volleyballers
Olympic medalists in volleyball
Volleyball players at the 2012 Summer Olympics
Medalists at the 2012 Summer Olympics
Medalists at the 2008 Summer Olympics
Volleyball players at the 2016 Summer Olympics
Pan American Games gold medalists for Brazil
Pan American Games silver medalists for Brazil
Pan American Games medalists in volleyball
Middle blockers
Expatriate volleyball players in Turkey
Brazilian expatriate sportspeople in Turkey
Medalists at the 2011 Pan American Games
21st-century Brazilian women